Below is a list of television series based on properties of Marvel Comics. This list includes live-action and animated series.

Live-action
All series produced by Marvel Studios and Marvel Television are set in the Marvel Cinematic Universe (MCU) unless otherwise noted.

Series inspired by Marvel Comics

From Marvel imprints

Malibu Comics

Icon Comics

Television specials

Web series

Pilots

Unscripted

Animated

From Marvel imprints

From Malibu Comics

From Icon Comics

Pilots

Television specials

Direct-to-video and digital series

Web and shorts series

Television blocks

See also 
 List of films based on Marvel Comics publications
 List of radio dramas based on Marvel Comics publications
 List of films based on DC Comics publications
 List of television series based on DC Comics publications
 Marvel Studios
 Marvel Television
 Marvel Animation
 Marvel Productions
 Marvel Knights
 Marvel Rising
 Spider-Man in television
 X-Men in television
 Marvel Comics Video Library
 List of Marvel Cinematic Universe television series
 List of unproduced television projects based on Marvel Comics

Notes

References

External links
 TV Shows at Marvel.com

Marvel Comics-related lists
Animated television shows based on Marvel Comics
Marvel Comics
Lists of works based on comics